Robert Edward Corbett (13 June 1923 – 3 February 2018) was a New Zealand organic chemist. He is noted for his contribution to natural product chemistry through the isolation and structural elucidation of compounds from New Zealand native plants.

Early life and education
Born on 13 June 1923, Corbett was the son of Walter Corbett and Margaret Whitehead Corbett (née Robertson). He studied at the University of Otago, graduating Master of Science with first-class honours in chemistry in 1945. Corbett later undertook doctoral studies at the University of Cambridge under Alexander Todd on the structures of some of the metabolites—puberulic acid, puberulonic acid, and stipitatic acid—of Penicillium species. He showed that they contain the tropolone skeleton, and his PhD thesis, titled The structure of certain antibiotics was completed in 1950.

In 1949, Corbett married Enid Mary Carter in Cambridge, England, and they went on to have two children.

Academic and research career
In 1945, Corbett was appointed as a lecturer in chemistry at Otago. After returning from Cambridge in 1950, Corbett rose to become a professor in 1966, and the Mellor Professor of Chemistry in 1972. When he retired in 1983, he was accorded the title of professor emeritus.

Corbett's research at Otago was primarily concerned with the study and structural elucidation of essential oils isolated from New Zealand native plants by steam distillation. Under his supervision in 1970, doctoral student Denis Lauren first isolated the diterpene compound from the rimu tree (Dacrydium cupressinum) that came to be known as laurenene. Corbett also investigated extractives from barks, leaves, heartwoods and lichens, and determined the structures of many new, and derivatives of known, di-, tri- and sesquiterpenoids. He also studied the synthesis and rearrangement of some of the compounds that his team isolated.

Later life and death
In retirement, the Corbetts lived in Tauranga. Enid Corbett died there in 2012, and Ted Corbett died on 3 February 2018, also in Tauranga.

Honours and awards
In 1972, Corbett was elected a Fellow of the Royal Society of New Zealand. He was also a Fellow of the New Zealand Institute of Chemistry.

Selected publications

References

External links
 Photograph of Ted Corbett

1923 births
2018 deaths
Scientists from Dunedin
University of Otago alumni
Alumni of the University of Cambridge
New Zealand chemists
Organic chemists
Academic staff of the University of Otago
Fellows of the Royal Society of New Zealand
Fellows of the New Zealand Institute of Chemistry